Thomas Beach may refer to:
Thomas Beach (painter) (1738–1806), English portrait painter
Thomas Beach (VC) (1824–1864), Scottish Victoria Cross recipient
Thomas Miller Beach (1841–1894), British spy
Thomas Boswall Beach (1866–1941), British Army colonel
Thomas Beach (poet) (died 1737), Welsh merchant and poet
Thomas Beach (politician) (born 1974), member of the South Carolina House of Representatives

See also

Beach (disambiguation)